Celio Barros (born in Brazil) is a Brazilian football manager who last worked as head coach of the DR Congo national football team.

Career

Barros managed AS Vita Club. In 1997, he was appointed head coach of the DR Congo national football team,  a position he held until 1997.

References

External links 
 Zaire national team summons Brazilian 
 Congolese football and Brazilian expertise 
 at National-Football-Teams 
 at Footballdatabase.eu 

Living people
Brazilian football managers
Year of birth missing (living people)